Atana or AThana (अठाण / अठाणा) is a raga (musical scale) in Carnatic music (South Indian classical music). It is a Janya raga (derived scale), whose Melakarta raga (parent, also known as janaka) is Sankarabharanam, 29th raga, commonly known as Shankarabharanam in the Melakarta system. Sometimes pronounced aDaaNaa (अडाणा). There is a Hindusthani raaga named अडाणा, which is totally different.  

Atana is very common in drama music. The note structures include, "Sadja, Chatusruti Rishabha, Suddha Madhyama, Pancama, Chatusruti Dhaivata, Kaisiki Nishada and as a rare feature, Kakali Nishada in descent."

It is considered to be a very catchy raga that gives a stage flavor for a musician when everything is going dull in a concert. It stimulates the audience by its qualities of Veeram (courage).

Structure and Lakshana 

Atana is one of those rare organically developed Raga where it doesn't adhere to strict ascending and descending order but has phrases which are used in interwoven patterns in its improvization. Its  structure (ascending and descending scale) is as follows (see swaras in Carnatic music for details on below notation and terms):

 : 
 : 

The swaras used are chatushruti rishabham, antara gandharam, shuddha madhyamam, chatushruti daivatam and kakali nishadam. Atana is a bhashanga raga (kind of raga where the arohana and avarohana are not strictly followed). That is, it has two anyaswaras (alien notes; foreign swaras). They are sadharana gandharam (G2) and kaishiki nishadham (N2).

Popular Compositions 
Here are some more compositions set to Atana.

Film Songs

Language:Tamil

Tamil Serials

Yamuna nadhiyin sooriya thogai      Dheerga Sumangali          2005-2006     Abinaya Creations

Notes

References

Janya ragas